Chadwick may refer to:

People
 Chadwick (surname)
 Chadwick (given name)

Places
 Chadwick, Illinois, United States, a village
 Chadwick, Michigan, United States, a former community
 Chadwick, Missouri, United States, an unincorporated community
 Chadwick Bay, New York, United States
 Chadwick Lake, New York, United States
 Chadwick, Western Australia, a suburb of the town of Esperance
 Chadwick (crater), a lunar crater

Other uses
 James Chadwick Medal and Prize, a biennial award presented by Institute of Physics for particle physics research
 Chadwick Arboretum, Columbus, Ohio
 The Chadwick, an apartment building in Indianapolis, Indiana, formerly on the National Register of Historic Places
 Chadwick School, a private K-12 school in Southern California
 Chadwick International, a day school in Songdo International City, South Korea, run by the Chadwick School

See also
 Chadwick End, West Midlands